Fimbristylis elegans is a sedge of the family Cyperaceae that is native to Australia.

It blooms between April to July and produces brown flowers.

In Western Australia it is found along creeks and streams in the Kimberley and Pilbara regions where it grows in sandy soils around limestone.

References

Plants described in 1940
Flora of Western Australia
elegans
Taxa named by Stanley Thatcher Blake